Home Fries is a 1998 American comedy-drama film directed by Dean Parisot, and starring Drew Barrymore and Luke Wilson. The script was originally penned by writer Vince Gilligan for a film class at New York University.

Plot
The film opens at Burger-Matic, where Henry Lever orders a milkshake at the drive-thru. At the window, he tells the attendant, Sally Jackson, that his wife knows about their affair. She asks him if he has also told his wife about her pregnancy. On his way home, he encounters a ferocious wind. It turns out to be a Cobra attack helicopter, which runs him off the road. In a panic, he flees through the woods and drops his heart medication. At an outdoor chapel, he sits on a bench as the helicopter hovers in front of him. The pilot, Angus Montier, shoots at the ground near him despite the protests of his copilot and brother, Dorian. The shots scare him enough to cause a fatal heart attack.

Throughout the attack, Dorian and Angus hear the chatter of Sally and her coworkers. Likewise, they hear the helicopter pilots on headsets. The next day, the police inform Beatrice Lever that Henry has died. She appears shocked and crestfallen, when Dorian and Angus arrive. It quickly becomes clear that she encouraged her sons to scare him to death. She is also furious about his affair, and wants revenge on his mistress. Angus and Dorian are worried that the people they heard on the radio might have overheard enough to connect them to his death. They quickly deduce that Burger-Matic is the only location close enough to have been on the same frequency. Angus goads Dorian into getting a job there to ensure that no one is wise to their crime.

Sally is heartbroken at the news about Henry. At work, Dorian bonds with her quickly. He gives her a model helicopter for her baby, and he explains that he and Angus fly them as reservists for the National Guard. She asks him to accompany her to lamaze class, since she doesn't have a partner. Eventually, he takes her to the base to see the helicopter that he flies. As she sits in the cockpit, she tells him about Henry.

Knowing that his mother is still furious about Henry's affair and that Angus would hurt Sally if he knew her identity, Dorian frantically tries to keep the truth from his family. When Angus discovers Sally's identity, Beatrice visits her under the pretense of making amends. Dorian is terrified of what Angus might do out of a misplaced loyalty to their crazy mother. Sure enough, he arrives at Sally's house in the attack helicopter. She, Dorian, and Beatrice escape in a truck. He eventually forces them to stop on the road. Beatrice pretends to be unaware of what is going on and leaves the truck. Dorian gradually convinces Angus to stop his attack.

The stress of the chase triggers Sally's labor, and Dorian drives her to the hospital. After she has a boy, he talks to him. He struggles to explain how they are related, and he tells him that he is lucky to have the best mother in the world.

Cast
 Drew Barrymore as Sally Jackson
 Catherine O'Hara as Beatrice Lever
 Luke Wilson as Dorian Montier
 Jake Busey as Angus Montier
 Shelley Duvall as Mrs. Jackson
 Kim Robillard as Billy
 Daryl Mitchell as Roy
 Lanny Flaherty as Red Jackson
 Chris Ellis as Henry Lever
 Blue Deckert as Sheriff
 Mark Walters as Deputy
 Shane Steiner as Soldier in Jeep
 Theresa Merritt as Mrs. Vaughan (Final Film Role)
 Jill Parker-Jones as Lamaze Instructor
 Morgana Shaw as Lucy Garland

Critical reception
The film received mixed reviews from critics. It currently holds a 31% rating on Rotten Tomatoes. Roger Ebert gave the film a mixed review, writing, "Home Fries is not a great movie, and as much as I finally enjoyed it, I'm not sure it's worth seeing two times just to get into the rhythm. More character and less plot might have been a good idea. But the actors are tickled by their characters and have fun with them, and so I did, too."

References

External links
 
 
 

1998 films
1998 romantic comedy-drama films
American romantic comedy-drama films
Films directed by Dean Parisot
Films shot in Texas
American pregnancy films
Warner Bros. films
Films with screenplays by Vince Gilligan
Films scored by Rachel Portman
1998 directorial debut films
1990s pregnancy films
1990s English-language films
1990s American films